Iranians in France include immigrants from Iran to France as well as their descendants of Iranian heritage or background. 
Iranians in France are referred to by hyphenated terms such as French-Iranians or French-Persians.

Terminology 
French-Iranian is used interchangeably with French-Persian, partly due to the fact that, in the Western world, Iran was known as "Persia". On the Nowruz of 1935, Reza Shah Pahlavi asked foreign delegates to use the term Iran, the endonym of the country used since the Sasanian Empire, in formal correspondence. Since then the use of the word "Iran" has become more common in the Western countries. This also changed the usage of the terms for Iranian nationality, and the common adjective for citizens of Iran changed from "Persian" to "Iranian". In 1959, the government of Mohammad Reza Shah Pahlavi, Reza Shah Pahlavi's son, announced that both "Persia" and "Iran" could officially be used interchangeably. However the issue is still debated today.

There is a tendency among French-Iranians to categorize themselves as "Persian" rather than "Iranian", mainly to dissociate themselves from the Islamic regime of Iran which is in charge since 1979 Revolution and the negativity associated with it, and also to distinguish themselves as being of Persian ethnicity, which comprise about 65% of Iran's population. While the majority of British-Iranians come from Persian backgrounds, there is a significant number of non-Persian Iranians such as Azerbaijanis and Kurds within the British-Iranian community, leading some scholars to believe that the label "Iranian" is more inclusive, since the label "Persian" excludes non-Persian minorities.  The Collins English Dictionary uses a variety of similar and overlapping definitions for the terms "Persian" and "Iranian".

History

Early history
Iranians from within the modern-day or previous borders of disestablished Iranian empires have a relatively long history in France. Jean Althen (Hovhannès Althounian), a Persian-Armenian agronomist from Nakhchivan, is known to have introduced madder to southern France in the 1750s. A statue of him was erected in Avignon expressing the city's gratefulness to him. The emergence of a genuine Iranian community in France can perhaps be traced back to 1855-6, when Farrok Khan Ḡaffārī, Amīn-al-Molk, later Amīn-al-Dawla was sent to Paris as the shah's envoy. During his embassy, a group of forty-two Persian students, who became known as les enfants de Perse (Thieury, p. 39) and who were chosen mostly from the graduates of the recently founded Dar al-fonūn, were sent to France. Meanwhile, in the course of the latter part of the 19th century, the Persian upper classes gradually began to send their sons to Europe and especially to France to pursue higher studies.

Early 20th century
France was a popular destination for Persian (Iranian) international students in the early 20th century. The first government-sponsored Persian students, a group of 20, all went to France in 1926. In 1932, the Pahlavi government drew up a competitive examination to determine the distribution of government scholarships to aspiring international students; 110 out of the 125 students who passed the examination went to France, making them the overwhelming majority of all Persian students abroad. Another 66 chose France as their destination the following year. Aside from government-sponsored students, there were also 537 privately financed Persian students living in France in 1934, nearly half of the total 1,165 privately financed international students. However, in 1938, a governmental decree prohibited students from going abroad on private funds to pursue degrees. The Iranian students in France lived in dormitories on their school campuses, unlike Iranian students in Germany who rented private accommodations by themselves; this meant that they were often subject to surveillance by officials from the Iranian embassy, and prevented the growth of anti-Pahlavi activism among them. Germany, rather than France, would thus become the major European centre of Iranian dissent in the 1930s.

Notable Iranians who studied in France include Mehdi Bazargan, the first Iranian to pass the entrance examination to any of the grandes écoles; he went on to become prime minister of Iran after the 1979 Iranian Revolution.

After the Iranian Revolution
Today, Iranians in France consist primarily of "political emigrants", who left Iran immediately after the revolution, because their association with communists, monarchists, or other opposition groups put them in danger, and "socio-cultural emigrants"—especially women and youths—who had little political affiliation but left Iran more slowly in the years following the revolution due to despair over the future of Iranian society. France expelled some of the political migrants, including Massoud Rajavi and his People's Mujahedin of Iran, in an effort to improve relations with Iran and secure the release of French hostages held by pro-Iranian forces in Lebanon.

Notable people
 Anicée Alvina, singer and actress
 Babak Amir-Tahmasseb, world champion kayaker
 Barbara Pravi, singer, songwriter and actress (nationality is French, but her maternal grandfather, Hossein Zenderoudi, is Iranian)
 Golshifteh Farahani, actress and musician
 Soheil Ayari, race car driver
 Sarah Kazemy, actress
 Mansour Bahrami, professional tennis player and entertainer
 Darya Dadvar, soprano soloist
 Heydar Ghiai, architect
 Mahmoud Khayami, founder of Iran Khodro
 Darius Khondji, cinematographer
 Mehran Karimi Nasseri, famous refugee
 Tristane Banon, journalist and writer.
 Soraya Esfandiary-Bakhtiari, former Queen of Iran, actress
 Shapour Bakhtiar, political scientist, writer and the last Prime Minister of Iran under king Mohammad Reza Pahlavi
 Pierre Omidyar, founder of eBay
 Bahram Aryana, former military commander under Mohammad Reza Pahlavi
 Patrick Ali Pahlavi, member of the Pahlavi dynasty
 Aravane Rezaï, professional tennis player
 Philippe Khorsand, actor
 Mahyar Monshipour, boxer
 Djahanguir Riahi, French furniture collector
 Marjane Satrapi, graphic novelist
 Abbas Gharabaghi, the last chief of staff of the Iranian armed forces as well as deputy commander-In-chief of the Iranian Imperial Army during the rule of the Pahlavi dynasty.
 Abolhassan Banisadr, politician, economist and human rights activist

See also
France–Iran relations
Iranian diaspora

References

Notes

Sources

Further reading

FRANCE xvii. Persian Community in France - Retrieved 19 October 2015

Ethnic groups in France
France
 
 
France–Iran relations
Immigration to France by country of origin
Middle Eastern diaspora in France
Islam in France
Muslim communities in Europe